Doora is a village and civil parish in County Clare, Ireland, just to the east of the town of Ennis.

Name
In Irish the word Dúr means "water", and Dúire means "of water", so the name means the parish of the water or bog.

Location
The parish is on the western border of the barony of Bunratty Upper, just east of the town of Ennis.
The land includes bog, upland pasture and farmland. It is drained by the River Quin, which runs southwest into the River Fergus.
The population in 1841 was 2,365 in 370 houses.
While the original eponymous hamlet decayed, a new village developed around Doora Church.

Antiquities
The history of Saint Brecan of Arran says he founded a church in Daclais that is named after him.
According to James Frost the townland of Kilbreckan holds the ruined church of Carrantemple, a very old building, which may be this church.
In fact Carntemple lies in the adjacent townland of Noughaval.
Doora Church may have been founded by Saint Brecan around 500 AD.
If Brecan was the founder, as tradition states, it would have been one of the first central mission churches in Clare.
There is also a ruined church named Kellavella.
Two holy wells in the parish are dedicated to Saint Breccan.

The parish has the remains of two castles. Ballyhannon Castle was the property of William Neylan in 1580. Renamed Castlefergus, it was still well preserved in 1893.
The castle has since been restored and may be rented.
The other castle, Clonmore, was completely ruined by the end of the 19th century.
As of 1845 the principal hamlets were Dowry and Ballaghboy. The parish name at that time was variously spelled Doora, Dowry, or Dowrie.

A notable native of the parish was Michael Considine of Castletown townland, who composed the famous folk song Spancil Hill in the early 1870s.

Sports
The Gaelic Athletic Association (GAA) club, St Josephs Doora-Barefield GAA, has its grounds in the parish with three playing pitches in the Gurteen townland.

Catholic parish

In 1837 the parish was united in the Catholic church with the parish of Kilraghtis. Doora today is in the Catholic parish of Doora-Barefield, also called Doora and Kilraghtis, in the Roman Catholic Diocese of Killaloe.

Townlands
The parish contains the townlands of Ardsollus, Ballaghboy, Ballyglass, Ballyortla (North), Ballyortla (South), Ballyvonnavaun, Bunnow, Castlefergus, Castletown, Cloonawee, Cloonmore, Corebeg, Creggaun, Deerpark, Dooneen, Drim, Drumdoolaghty, Finanagh, Gaurus, Gortataggart, Gorteen, Kilbreckan, Kilfeilim, Killawinna, Knockanean, Knockaskibbole, Knockhogan, Monanoe, Moyriesk and Noughaval.

The townlands of Castlefergus and Ardsollus are isolated from the rest of the parish, a small distance to the south.
The town of Ennis includes the townlands of Ballaghboy,  Bunnow,  Gaurus, and Knockanean.

References

Sources

 

 

Civil parishes of County Clare
Towns and villages in County Clare